On 16 January 2019, Aya Maasarwe (alt: Aiia Maasarwe), a Palestinian with Israeli citizenship who was studying at La Trobe University in Melbourne, Australia as an exchange student, was killed as she returned home from an evening at a comedy club in North Melbourne. The violent, random nature of the killing sparked renewed community concern about the safety of women, especially after dark in Melbourne. Parallels were drawn to the murders of Eurydice Dixon, Jill Meagher and Maša Vukotić. Maasarwe was buried in her hometown of Baqa al-Gharbiyye, Israel.

Background
Aya Maasarwe was born in 1997 in Baqa al-Gharbiyye, Israel, to a Palestinian Muslim family. She was studying at Shanghai University, and was in Melbourne as part of a student exchange program with La Trobe University. Maasarwe was undertaking a business degree intending to work later at her father's firm in China.

Death
She had been returning home after attending a performance at a comedy club in North Melbourne and was on a video call with her sister.

Maasarwe's body was discovered around 7 am in shrubbery near the carpark of Polaris 3083 Town Centre shopping mall by maintenance workers. Items of clothing, suspected to belong to her attacker, were located within  of her body.

On 18 January, 20-year-old vagrant Codey Herrmann was arrested in Pioneer Reserve, a park in the nearby suburb of Greensborough. The following day he was charged with Maasarwe's rape and murder. He appeared in the  Melbourne Magistrates' Court and was remanded in custody.

On 21 January the family received the body of Maasarwe from the coroner. In the suburb of Dandenong at the Albanian Mosque, family along with supporters gathered for the Janazah (Islamic funeral rites) and prayer service for Maasarwe. The family returned to Israel on 22 January with her body. She was buried in her home town of Baqa al-Gharbiyye. Her family later created a scholarship for Palestinian doctors in her name.

On 29 October 2019, Herrmann was sentenced to 36 years in prison (30 years non-parole) for the rape and murder of Maasarwe.

Reactions
Victorian Premier Daniel Andrews, in a statement condemning the killing, said that "sexist attitudes in our society" needed to change to end the problem of violence against women in Australia. Andrews stated that "Victorians are united in sadness. In anger that this bright young woman’s life was taken from her. I hope we are also united in determination. That we can – and must – end this culture of violence against women."

References

2010s in Melbourne
2019 murders in Australia
Arab citizens of Israel
Deaths by person in Australia
Female murder victims
Israeli people murdered abroad
Israeli Muslims
January 2019 crimes in Oceania
January 2019 events in Australia
Murder in Melbourne
Violence against women in Australia
Women in Melbourne